Major General Abdulkhakim Kutbudinovich Gadzhiyev (born 13 February 1966) is a Russian politician from Dagestan. He was elected to the State Duma in the Northern Dagestan constituency in the 2021 election.

Abdulkhakim Gadzhiyev was born in 1966 in Zubutli, Kazbekovsky District, Dagestan Autonomous Soviet Socialist Republic. In 1992 he graduated from the Nizhny Novgorod Higher School of the Ministry of Internal Affairs. In 2005–2010 he was deputy head of the Organized Crime Control Department of Dagestan interior ministry. In 2016–2021 Gadzhiyev was deputy commander of the North Caucasian District of the National Guard of Russia. In 2021, he was elected to the 8th State Duma from the Northern Dagestan constituency. He is a member of the committee on security and anti-corruption.

References 

1966 births
Living people
Eighth convocation members of the State Duma (Russian Federation)
21st-century Russian politicians
People from Kazbekovsky District
Avar people
Russian police officers
United Russia politicians
20th-century Russian people